PieceMan is an EP by American noise rock band Cop Shoot Cop, released in 1989 by Vertical Records. The record was limited to 1000 pressings. However, the songs "Disconnected 666" and "Eggs for Rib" would be rerecorded for Consumer Revolt while "Rbt. Tilton Handjob" would appear on the 1994 re-issue of Headkick Facsimile.

Track listing

Personnel
Adapted from the PieceMan liner notes.

Cop Shoot Cop
Tod Ashley – high-end bass guitar, lead vocals (A1)
Jim Coleman – sampler (B1)
Jack Natz – low-end bass guitar (B1), lead vocals (B1)
David Ouimet – sampler
Phil Puleo – drums, percussion

Production and additional personnel
Cop Shoot Cop – production, mixing
Subvert Entertainment – cover art, design
Wharton Tiers – engineering, mixing

Release history

References

External links 
 PieceMan EP at Discogs (list of releases)

1989 EPs
Cop Shoot Cop albums